Sarangesa gaerdesi, commonly known as the Namibian elfin, is a species of butterfly in the family Hesperiidae. It is found in Namibia. The habitat consists of dry savanna.

The adult wing colouration matches the colour of the leaves of the larval host plants and adults of both sexes feed from the flowers of these plants. They are possibly on wing year round, but are most common in midsummer. Subspecies smithae has been recorded from August to October and in late February.

The larvae of subspecies gaerdesi feed on Petalidium engleranum and the larvae of subspecies smithae on Petalidium variabile.

Subspecies
Sarangesa gaerdesi gaerdesi - northern and central Namibia
Sarangesa gaerdesi smithae Vári, 1976 - south-central Namibia

References

Butterflies described in 1949
Celaenorrhinini